The J. J. Donovan House, also known as Donovan House, at 1201 Garden Street in Bellingham, Washington is a two-and-a-half-story historic house that is listed on the National Register of Historic Places.

It was built in 1890 for Edward Fischer and was finished with fine details by its second owner, industrialist John Joseph Donovan.  Its architecture is Stick style with Tudor Revival details plus other elements from  other Victorian era architectural styles.

Early in his career J. J. Donovan worked for the Northern Pacific Railroad as a construction engineer.  Later he was a significant player in the lumber industry.

It was used as a women's dormitory by Western Washington University for roughly 25 years.

See also
 J. J. Donovan

References

Houses on the National Register of Historic Places in Washington (state)
Queen Anne architecture in Washington (state)
Tudor Revival architecture in the United States
Houses completed in 1890
Whatcom County, Washington